The Ukrainian Catholic Eparchy of Kolomyia is an eparchy of the Ukrainian Greek Catholic Church situated in Ukraine. The eparchy is suffragan to the Ukrainian Catholic Archeparchy of Ivano-Frankivsk. The eparchy was established on 20 April 1993.

History
April 20, 1993: Established as Eparchy of Kolomyia – Chernivtsi from the Ukrainian Catholic Eparchy of Ivano-Frankivsk.
September 12, 2017: Lost territory to establish the Ukrainian Catholic Eparchy of Chernivtsi

Eparchial and auxiliary bishops
The following is a list of the bishops of Kolomyia – Chernivtsi and their terms of service:
(20 Apr 1993 – 12 Dec 2004) Pavlo Vasylyk
 (13 May 2003 – 12 Dec 2004) Volodymyr Viytyshyn, coadjutor bishop 
(12 Dec 2004 – 02 Jun 2005) Volodymyr Viytyshyn
(02 Jun 2005 – 21 May 2013) Mykola Simkaylo
(22 May 2013 – 13 Feb 2014) Vasyl Ivasyuk, titular bishop of Benda, Archiepiscopal Administrator
(since 13 Feb 2014 – ) Vasyl Ivasyuk

See also
Ukrainian Greek Catholic Church
 Catholic Church

External links
GCatholic.org information on the eparchy
Profile at Catholic Hierarchy
Official website 

Kolomyia
Roman Catholic dioceses and prelatures established in the 20th century
Christian organizations established in 1993